Abdellah Haimoud (born 21 May 2001) is a Moroccan professional footballer who plays as a midfielder for Botola club Wydad AC.

Club career
After starting his youth career at Mohammed VI Football Academy. In 2021, he obtained a transfer to Wydad AC.

On May 30, 2022, he entered the game in the 84th minute in place of Guy Mbenza against Al-Ahly SC in the final of the CAF Champions League and won the competition thanks to a 2-0 victory at the Stade Mohammed V. On July 28, 2022, he was established and reached the final of the Moroccan Cup after a penalty session defeat against RS Berkane (draw, 0-0).

International career

On July 28, 2022, he was summoned by coach Hicham Dmii for a training camp with the Morocco A' team , appearing on a list of 23 players who will take part in the Islamic Solidarity Games in August 2022.

On September 15, 2022, he was called up by Hicham Dmii with Olympic Morocco for a double confrontation against Olympic Senegal as part of a preparation camp for qualifying for the 2024 Summer Olympics .

Honours 

 Wydad AC

 Botola: 2020–21, 2021-22
 CAF Champions League: 2021–22

References

External links 
 

2001 births
Living people
Wydad AC players
Moroccan footballers